Esfian (also Romanized as Esfīān; also known as Iapiu) is a village in Nimbeluk Rural District, Nimbeluk District, Qaen County, South Khorasan Province, Iran. At the 2006 census, its population was 33, in 8 families.

References 

Populated places in Qaen County